Monreith ( / 'mon-REETH') is a small seaside village in the Machars, in the historical county of Wigtownshire, Scotland.

A ruined church near Monreith is called "Kirkmaiden-in-Fernis" and was dedicated to St Medan. The chancel was rebuilt as a mausoleum for the Maxwell family of nearby Monreith House and in which is buried Sir Herbert Maxwell.  Within the graveyard is the last resting place of Captain François Thurot, a French privateer captain who lost his life in a sea battle off the Mull of Galloway. 

Above the church on the cliff is the memorial to Gavin Maxwell the naturalist,  and author of Ring of Bright Water, an otter, sculpted in bronze by Penny Wheatley in 1978. On visits back to the family seat of Monreith House, Maxwell would exercise his tame otter Mijbil on the beach below.

See also 
 Monreith House

References

https://canmore.org.uk/site/62660/kirkmaiden-old-church-and-churchyard

Villages in Dumfries and Galloway